Monogenism or monogenesis is the theory of human origins which posits a common descent for all human races. 

Monogenism or monogenesis may also refer to:

 Recent African origin of modern humans
 Asexual reproduction, which involves only one parent
 Monogenesis (linguistics)
 Monogenetic theory of pidgins

See also
Monogenetic (disambiguation)
Monogenic (disambiguation)